Vivid knowledge refers to a specific kind of knowledge representation.

The idea of a vivid knowledge base is to get an interpretation mostly straightforward out of it – it implies the interpretation. Thus, any query to such a knowledge base can be reduced to a database-like query.

Propositional knowledge base 

A propositional knowledge base KB is vivid iff KB is a complete and consistent set of literals (over some vocabulary).

Such a knowledge base has the property that it as exactly one interpretation, i.e. the interpretation is unique. A check for entailment of a sentence can simply be broken down into its literals and those can be answered by a simple database-like check of KB.

First-order knowledge base 

A first-order knowledge base KB is vivid iff for some finite set of positive function-free ground literals KB+,

 KB = KB+ ∪ Negations ∪ DomainClosure ∪ UniqueNames,

whereby

 Negations ≔ { ¬p | p is atomic and KB ⊭ p },
 DomainClosure ≔ { (ci ≠ cj) | ci, cj are distinct constants },
 UniqueNames ≔ { ∀x: (x = c1) ∨ (x = c2) ∨ ..., where the ci are all the constants in KB+ }.

All interpretations of a vivid first-order knowledge base are isomorphic.

See also 
 Closed world assumption

References 

Knowledge representation